Metcalf may refer to:


People and fictional characters
 Metcalf (surname)

Places in the United States 
 Metcalf, Georgia, a village
 Metcalf, Illinois, a village
 Metcalfe County, Kentucky
 Metcalf, Holliston, Massachusetts, a district of Holliston
 Metcalf Hill, New York, a mountain

Other uses 
 USS Metcalf (DD-595), a US Navy destroyer
 Metcalf Center for Science and Engineering, a building at Boston University in Massachusetts
 Metcalf (dinghy), an American sailboat design
 Metcalf transmission substation, site of the 2013 Metcalf sniper attack which damaged electrical transformers, near San Jose, California
 Metcalf, a fictional town in Alfred Hitchcock's film Strangers on a Train

See also
 Metcalf Chateau, a group of Asian-American artists with ties to Honolulu
 Metcalfe (disambiguation)